Iquo Inyang Minimah  is a Nigerian lawyer and female politician from Akwa Ibom State.

Career 
She represented the people of Ikono/Ini in Akwa Ibom state at the national assembly under the platform of People's Democratic party from 1999 to 2003. Minimah was reelected for a second term that lasted till 2007.

In 2011, she contested for the Senate under the All Progressive Congress but lost the primaries.

References 

Akwa Ibom State politicians